Liam Weldon (15 October 1933 - 28 November 1995) was a singer and songwriter in the Irish folk tradition.

Life
Born in Dublin, Ireland, Liam, like many people in inner city Dublin at that time, was moved out of the developing city to Ballyfermot, a suburb on the outskirts of the city.

Liam had a lifelong interest in the songs of the Irish Travellers and his own songs reflected a strong awareness of poverty, disadvantage and exploitation. His personal ballad style had features of other genres, but the precision of intent in his abrasive lyrics was unmistakable.

Six years working in England from the age of sixteen tempered his social awareness, but yet his lyrics often have deep lyric sensitivity. He sang first at the Central Bar in Aungier St., Dublin, and with his wife Nellie ran gigs and clubs through the 1970s.

In Dublin, he organised the Pavees Club in Slatterys on Capel Street and sessions in the Tailor's Hall and the Brazen Head. In the early seventies, Weldon sang and played bodhrán in the group "1691". Named after the year of the signing of the Treaty of Limerick, other members of the group included Tommy Peoples, Tríona Ní Dhomhnaill, Peter Browne, and Matt Molloy, who later went on to form The Bothy Band.

Liam is well known for his songs "Dark Horse on the Wind" and "The Blue Tar Road".  "Blue Tar Road" is a criticism of Dublin Corporation in the eviction of Traveller families at Cherry Orchard, County Dublin.
"Dark Horse on the Wind", written in 1966 on the 50th anniversary of the Rising, is a lament for the lost dreams of the 1916 Volunteers and a searing indictment of society in post-independence Ireland and, indeed, a prophetic warning of the political troubles which were at that point imminent on the island as a whole.

Documentary Film

In the summer of 2019, film producer Lorraine Kennedy began production of a documentary film about Liam Weldon, recruiting musician and music documentary film-maker Myles O'Reilly (Musician) to direct the project. Dark Horse on the Wind a film about the life and songs of Liam Weldon was completed in January 2022 and opened on 5 March 2022 at the Dublin International Film Festival.

Discography

 Sixteen Ninety-One — Irish Folk Songs, 1973 (Arfolk, France)
 Dark Horse On The Wind, 1976 (Mulligan, Ireland) (CD reissue, 1999)
 Elixir - Liam Weldon, Seán Howley, Brian O’Donoghue, David Hopkins and Pol Huellou (Goasco, 1984). Liam Weldon sings two songs on this album
 Liam Weldon with Pol Huellou (cassette only, Goasco, 1990)
Sixteen Ninety-One Irish Folk Songs was reissued on CD by Arfolk in the 1990s under the title A Way For Ireland - Irish Traditional Pub Music (the CD also features a 1973 album, Irish Pub Music, from the Castle Ceili Band)

References

See also
Traditional Irish Singers

Irish folk singers
Irish male singer-songwriters
1933 births
1995 deaths
20th-century Irish male singers